Althaea or Althea (Ancient Greek: Ἀλθαία Althaía "healer" from ἀλθαίνω althaino, "to cure", also "a kind of mallow") was the queen of Calydon in Greek mythology.

Family 
Althaea was the daughter of King Thestius and Eurythemis, and was sister to Leda, Hypermnestra, Iphiclus, Euippus. She was also the wife of Oeneus, king of Calydon, and mother of sons, Meleager, Toxeus, Thyreus (Pheres or Phereus), Clymenus, Agelaus (Ageleus), Periphas and daughters, Deianeira, Gorge, Melanippe and Eurymede (the latter two were included in the Meleagrids).  According to some writers, Meleager was the result of a liaison with the Greek god Ares, and Deianeira the progeny of Althaea and the god Dionysus. In some accounts, Ancaeus was called her son by the god Poseidon.

Mythology 
Althaea is especially remembered in ancient story about the fate of her son Meleager; they became the cause of each other's deaths. When Meleager was born, the Moirai (the Fates) predicted he would only live until a brand, burning in the family hearth, was consumed by fire.

Oeneus and Mars both slept one night with Althaea, daughter of Thestius. When Meleager was born from them, suddenly in the palace the Fates, Clotho, Lachesis, and Atropos, appeared. They thus sang his fate: Clotho said that he would be noble, Lachesis that he would be brave, but Atropos looking at a brand burning on the hearth and said, “He will live only as long as this brand remains unconsumed.” When Althaea, the mother, heard this, she leaped from the bed, put out the fatal brand, and buried it in the midst of the palace, so that it shouldn’t be destroyed by fire.

In Aeschylus' Libation Bearers Althaea is mentioned by the Chorus of captive slaves, serving women of Clytemnestra, in a recollection of 'hatreds that stopped at nothing'.
Let anyone whose mind is steady remember this, once he has learned the story of Thestius' daughter, ruthless Althaea, who killed her own son. She contrived a plot to burn the brand that fate assigned to span his life; it had been kept since the day he came out crying from his mother's loins. Deliberately, deceitfully, she set on fire what was to have kept pace with him from birth to death. It glowed bright red before the fire blackened it.

Meleager grew to be a well-respected prince. One spring Oeneus sacrificed the first fruits of the seasons to all the gods, omitting Artemis by mistake. Enraged by the slight, Artemis sent a boar of unnatural size and strength to ruin the land of Calydon. Meleager was one of the warriors who hunted the boar, along with the famous huntress Atalanta and Althaea's brothers. Meleager dealt the killing strike to the boar, but gave the skin to Atalanta both because he had fallen in love with her and because she had landed the first and many subsequent blows onto the animal. When Althaea's brothers, “thinking scorn that a woman should get the prize in the face of men, took the skin from her, alleging that it belonged to them by right of birth if Meleager did not choose to take it,” Meleager flew into a rage and killed both of his uncles.

When Althaea learned what had happened, she retrieved the brand from where she had concealed it and placed the brand back upon the fire, killing him. Some say that she and Meleager's wife Cleopatra later hanged themselves, others that she killed herself with a dagger.

Family tree

Notes

References 

 Aeschylus, translated in two volumes. 2. Libation Bearers by Herbert Weir Smyth, Ph. D. Cambridge, MA. Harvard University Press. 1926. Online version at the Perseus Digital Library. Greek text available from the same website.
 Antoninus Liberalis, The Metamorphoses of Antoninus Liberalis translated by Francis Celoria (Routledge 1992). Online version at the Topos Text Project.
 Gaius Julius Hyginus, Fabulae from The Myths of Hyginus translated and edited by Mary Grant. University of Kansas Publications in Humanistic Studies. Online version at the Topos Text Project.
 Hesiod, Catalogue of Women from Homeric Hymns, Epic Cycle, Homerica translated by Evelyn-White, H G. Loeb Classical Library Volume 57. London: William Heinemann, 1914. Online version at theio.com
 Homer, The Iliad with an English Translation by A.T. Murray, Ph.D. in two volumes. Cambridge, MA., Harvard University Press; London, William Heinemann, Ltd. 1924. Online version at the Perseus Digital Library.
 Homer, Homeri Opera in five volumes. Oxford, Oxford University Press. 1920. Greek text available at the Perseus Digital Library.
 Publius Ovidius Naso, Metamorphoses translated by Brookes More (1859–1942). Boston, Cornhill Publishing Co. 1922. Online version at the Perseus Digital Library.
 Publius Ovidius Naso, Metamorphoses. Hugo Magnus. Gotha (Germany). Friedr. Andr. Perthes. 1892. Latin text available at the Perseus Digital Library.
Thomas Bulfinch. Bulfinch's Mythology: The Age of Fable or Stories of Gods and Heroes. 1855 (Chapter XVIII).

Princesses in Greek mythology
Queens in Greek mythology
Family of Calyce
Women of Ares
Metamorphoses characters
Aetolian characters in Greek mythology
Suicides in Greek mythology